The Timothy Bancroft House is a historic house on Bancroft Road in Harrisville, New Hampshire.  Located in a rural area once known as Mosquitoville, this c. 1785 wood-frame house was built by Timothy Bancroft, who operated a sawmill nearby that was one of the town's major industries for nearly a century.  The house was listed on the National Register of Historic Places in 1988.

Description and history
The Timothy Bancroft House stands in what is now a rural and isolated area of northern Harrisville, near the end of Bancroft Road.  Set on a rise overlooking the former mill site, it is a -story wood-frame structure, with a gabled roof and clapboarded exterior.  An older ell extends to the east, with its own central chimney.  The styling of the house is Greek Revival, with wide cornerboards and a gabled hood over the entrance.  A shed-roof porch extends across the front of the ell.

Timothy Bancroft is believed to have built the ell of this house in about 1785; the larger main block was probably added in the mid-19th century.  During the 19th century, the Bancroft mill complex was at the center of a community known variously as Mosquitoville and Mosquitobush.  The complex included a number of additional buildings, and the busy mill supplied wood products to the textile mills in Harrisville center, and was a major local employer.  The mill burned in 1875.  The house was subsequently used as housing for another nearby sawmill, and then as a summer residence.

See also
Wildwood Cottage, another Mosquitoville remnant
National Register of Historic Places listings in Cheshire County, New Hampshire

References

Houses on the National Register of Historic Places in New Hampshire
Greek Revival houses in New Hampshire
Houses completed in 1785
Houses in Harrisville, New Hampshire
National Register of Historic Places in Cheshire County, New Hampshire